This list of disasters in Canada includes major disasters (arranged by date), either man-made or natural, that occurred on Canadian soil.

List

Pre-2023'

1597–1867

1867–1916

1917–1966

1970–2016

2017–present

See also 

 List of disasters in Canada by death toll
 List of pipeline accidents in Canada

References

External links 

Canadian Disasters: an historical survey by Robert L. Jones